Professor Arthur Obel, a Kenyan scientist, identified the first cases of Human Immunodeficiency Virus in Kenya and treated many AIDS patients. He developed two medications, Kemron and Pearl Omega, to cure HIV/AIDS. It was later discovered that neither Kemron nor Pearl Omega were effective medications against the retrovirus.

Education, career, and honoraries

Education 
Professor Arthur Obel received his PhD in Therapeutics from the London University in 1978. He then received his M.D. in Clinical Medicine from the University of Nairobi in 1987.

Career 
Dr. Obel was head of the Public Administration of the Kenya Institute of Administration in 1990. He also had the position of Chief Research Officer of the Kenya Medical Research Institute (KEMRI) from 1989 to 1991. Obel later became the Chief Scientist of the Office of the President of Kenya from 1995 to 1999. This high position in government allowed him to attain many funds for his research. Being in a respectable position also allowed him to have many close friends that were high ranking government officials, such as Philip Mbithi, the former Chief Secretary in the Office of the President of Kenya.

Honoraries 
Professor Obel received many honoraries. He was a member of the Global Epidemiology Society in 1983 and the Achievers Society in 1983. Obel did a fellowship with numerous institutions including the Jewish Chemists Federation in 1986, the International Diabetes Federation in 1986, and the Global Pharmaceutical Federation in 1987. He was also a Project Management Professional (PMP) with the Centre for Finance and Project Management in 2004.

Kemron  
Dr. Arthur Obel claimed that Kemron and Pearl Omega were the cures to HIV/AIDS.

Professor Obel joined KEMRI, the Kenya Medical Research Institute, and they aimed to find an effective treatment to eradicate HIV/AIDS. KEMRI and Obel picked up a medication that was developed but denied approval for testing in the United States and lowered the concentration before testing. This medication was Kemron. The medication was tested in other areas, such as the University of Makerere. It was then discovered that Kemron did nothing much to help the disease. Kemron only reversed the symptoms of the HIV disease for a short period of time. Because of this, people were quick to purchase the expensive medication. Dr. Obel received much backlash because of this and resigned from KEMRI in January 1991.

Pearl Omega 
Pearl Omega, a herb, was found to have very few positive outcomes when combatting HIV. Obel claimed that Pearl Omega was a protease inhibitor and sold the drug at a very expensive price. One bottle of Pearl Omega was KSh. , the equivalent of £350 stg. Human trials of this medication started in 1991 and Obel claimed that the medication restored the health of seven AIDS patients. However, there was no scientific data to back up his claims. People were much less inclined to purchase the second drug produced by Obel after Kemron. The Health Minister disowned the drug and many institutions banned the use of the drug after the discreditating of Obel. Pearl Omega was later found to be sold in the black market illegally as it is illegal for any medication to be sold before it is approved by the Health Minister in Kenya.

Aftermath of Kemron and Pearl Omega 
Professor Obel was sued by many patients because of Kemron and Pearl Omega's ineffectiveness and he later had a court case versus the Kenya AIDS Society in 1998. This court case against Obel was because he manufactured, distributed, and sold Pearl Omega without the approval of the Health Minister of Kenya. Obel won the case and gained a reputation of falsifying information and fraud.

Professor Arthur Obel continued his work on HIV/AIDS even after the discreditation of the Kemron and Pearl Omega medications. In 2011, he published work on the correlation of WHO clinical staging with CD4 cell count in adult HIV positive patients at the Kenyatta National Hospital.

Obel wrote a book called "Curbing the HIV/AIDS Menace Effectively" in 1995.

Work not relating to HIV/AIDS 
Although Obel is most known for his work on Kemron and Pearl Omega, a big part of Dr. Obel's research consisted of practical therapeutics. He has numerous published works including practical therapeutics on antibiotic therapy, the use of insulin, the use of anti-diabetic agents, the treatment of gout, the treatment of peptic ulcers, anxiolytic drugs, and the therapy of diarrhoeal diseases.

Professor Obel also has written, and self-published, numerous books such as "Power and Intrigue," a book relating to one's power, whether it be associative, personal, professional, or reward power, "Kenya's Industrialization Strategy," and "Resilient Manhood Dynamism: The Basis of a Rapid Take-off."

References 

Kenyan scientists
HIV/AIDS researchers
University of Nairobi alumni
Year of birth missing (living people)
Living people